Nuclear envelope pore membrane protein POM 121 is a protein that in humans is encoded by the POM121 gene. Alternatively spliced variants that encode different protein isoforms have been described but the full-length nature of only one has been determined.

Function 

The nuclear envelope creates distinct nuclear and cytoplasmic compartments in eukaryotic cells. It consists of two concentric membranes perforated by nuclear pores, large protein complexes that form aqueous channels to regulate the flow of macromolecules between the nucleus and the cytoplasm. These complexes are composed of at least 100 different polypeptide subunits, many of which belong to the nucleoporin family. This gene encodes a member of the FG-repeat-containing nucleoporins. The protein encoded by this gene is an integral membrane protein that localizes to the central spoke ring complex and participates in anchoring the nuclear pore complex to the nuclear envelope.

Antibodies against this protein can be used to identify the nuclear envelope in immunofluorescence experiments.

References

Further reading

Nuclear pore complex